Abee is a hamlet in Alberta, Canada.

Abee may also refer to:

Abee (meteorite), a meteorite that fell on 1952 in Abee, Alberta, Canada
Abée Castle, a castle in Tinlot, Liège, Belgium

People with the surname
Steve Abee, American writer and poet

See also
McAbee, a surname